Days and Nights is a 2013 American drama film directed and written by Christian Camargo. The film is inspired by The Seagull by Anton Chekhov and set in rural New England in the 1980s.

Cast
 Allison Janney - Elizabeth - Movie star
 William Hurt - Herb - Dying brother of Elizabeth
 Ben Whishaw - Eric - Artist - Son of Elizabeth
 Katie Holmes - Alex - Daughter of Elizabeth
 Mark Rylance - Stephen - Ornithologist - Husband of Alex
 Juliet Rylance - Eva - Eric's muse
 Christian Camargo - Peter - Friend of Elizabeth
 Jean Reno - Louis - Family doctor
 Michael Nyqvist - Johan - Caretaker
 Cherry Jones - Mary - Wife of Johan

Reception
, Days and Nights 0% approval rating on Rotten Tomatoes, based on 13 reviews with an average rating of 4.11/10.

Ken Rudolph recognized that the actors were splendid, but the film seemed trite, and pretentious. The film critic Thorsten Krüger considers that Camargo "has nothing to tell and nothing to say."   The film "intends to be profound, but offers too little to be interesting".

"The cast, so packed with talent that Jean Reno and Cherry Jones barely register, is stuck with stagey dialogue. Juliet Rylance, in the Nina part, has a particularly hard time."

The World Cinema Now Program reviewed the film as: "Anton Chekhov’s The Seagull has seen numerous iterations over the decades, but actor/director Christian Camargo (The Hurt Locker) is able to honor the darkness and depth of this Russian tragedy while relocating it to a Memorial Day weekend in rural New England and putting his own contemporary spin on the material. With a haunting score, lovely cinematography, and strong performances from a remarkable ensemble cast, we see a family come together then fracture apart over the course of one disastrous weekend."

The New York Times commented that The Seagull,' with its depiction of fin de siècle ennui, has been hollowed out and trivialized. So little time is given to the subsidiary characters in 'Days and Nights' that, at times, the movie barely makes sense. The avian symbol has been changed from a sea gull to a bald eagle. What remains is a cracked shell."

References

External links 
 
 

2013 films
2013 drama films
American drama films
Films based on plays by Anton Chekhov
Films set in Connecticut
Films shot in Connecticut
Films set in country houses
2013 directorial debut films
2010s English-language films
2010s American films